Government Offices for the English Regions (GOs) were established in 1994 by the John Major government. Until 2011, they were the primary means by which a wide range of policies and programmes of the Government of the United Kingdom were delivered in the regions of England.

There were Government Offices in the East Midlands, East of England, London, North East, North West (until 1998 there was a separate GO for Merseyside), South East, South West, West Midlands and  Yorkshire and the Humber regions.

Purpose
The Offices represented thirteen Whitehall departments, and were involved in regenerating communities, fighting crime, tackling housing needs, improving public health, raising standards in education and skills, tackling countryside issues and reducing unemployment.

Departments represented
By the time of their abolition, there were twelve Whitehall Departments represented in the Offices:

Department for Communities and Local Government (lead department)
Department for Business, Innovation and Skills
Cabinet Office
Department for Culture, Media and Sport
Department for Children, Schools and Families
Department of Energy and Climate Change
Department for Environment, Food and Rural Affairs
Department of Health
Department for Transport
Department for Work and Pensions
Home Office
Ministry of Justice
HM Treasury

Abolition
The abolition of the Government Offices was announced in the Coalition Government's Spending Review in October 2010.  It was stated at that time that "The GO Network will therefore close no later than the end of March 2011. Functions undertaken by the GO Network are now in the process of being wound down, with the exception of a small number which may transfer elsewhere."

See also
 Regional development agency
 Regional minister
 :Category:Regional Select Committees of the British House of Commons
 Regional State Administrative Agency (Finland)

References

External links
National Archives archive page

Regional planning in England
Politics of England
Defunct public bodies of the United Kingdom